Dossou Vignissy (born 15 June 1954) is a Beninese sprinter. He competed in the men's 4 × 100 metres relay at the 1988 Summer Olympics.

References

1954 births
Living people
Athletes (track and field) at the 1988 Summer Olympics
Beninese male sprinters
Olympic athletes of Benin
Place of birth missing (living people)